LaMoure Public Schools or LaMoure Public School is a school district and associated school in LaMoure, North Dakota.

References

External links
 LaMoure Public Schools

School districts in North Dakota
LaMoure County, North Dakota